Damon Christopher Thomas (born 27 October 1949) is the former Lord Mayor of Hobart from 2011 to 2014. He continued to serve as an Alderman of the City of Hobart until failing to win re-election in 2022.

Thomas had a range of previous appointments including Tasmanian Crown Solicitor, State Ombudsman, CEO of the Tasmanian Chamber of Commerce and Industry and Korean Consul. Thomas has Bachelor of Arts, Bachelor of Laws and Master of Laws degrees from the University of Queensland, and a Diploma of Company Administration from the University of New England. He is a Fellow of the Australian Institute of Management.

References

External links
Thomas 4 Hobart – electoral website

1949 births
Living people
Mayors and Lord Mayors of Hobart
Tasmanian local councillors
Ombudsmen in Australia
University of Queensland alumni
University of New England (Australia) alumni